The Church of England Marriage Measure 2008, No. 1 is a Church of England Measure passed by the General Synod of the Church of England extending the right to marry in a Church of England church to parish churches with which a person has a qualifying connection.

Effects 
Previously, people had the right to be married in a Church of England parish church only if they were resident in the parish for six months or if they regularly worshipped there. In order to marry in another church, the couple would have to obtain a special licence from the Archbishop of Canterbury, which was not automatically given. 

The Church of England Marriage Measure was introduced to extend the rights for people to marry in churches. The Measure allows a couple to be married in a church of their choice if one of them has a "qualifying connection" to it, such as being baptised or confirmed there. The Measure also grants them the right to marry in parishes in which their parents lived or regularly worshipped, or where their parents or grandparents had been married. However, this right does not extend to cathedrals.

Passage 
The Measure was passed by the General Synod of the Church of England and passed through Parliament, receiving Royal Assent from the Supreme Governor of the Church of England, Queen Elizabeth II on 28 May 2008. Concerns were expressed at the time that it would lead to "wedding tourism". Within two years of its introduction, marriages in the Church of England rose by 4% as a result. The approach of the Measure was mirrored in the Marriage (Wales) Act 2010, bringing the position of the disestablished Church in Wales in line with the Church of England.

References 

Church of England legislation
Marriage in Christianity
Marriage law in the United Kingdom
Christianity and law in the 21st century
Marriage, unions and partnerships in England